The 1977 Asian Invitational Badminton Championships which was the second edition of Asian Invitational Championships took place in the month of February in Hong Kong. The individual competitions except Mixed doubles were conducted. A total of thirteen Asian countries took part in this event. At the end of day, China won all the disciplines except Men's doubles which was won by Indonesia.

Medalists

Men's singles

Women's singles

Men's doubles

Women's doubles

References 

 
Badminton Asia Championships
Asian Badminton Championships
1977 Badminton Asia Championships
Badminton Asia Championships
Badminton Asia Championships